This is a list of British television related events from 1991.

Events

January
1 January 
The Independent Television Commission (ITC) replaces the Independent Broadcasting Authority (IBA). On the same day, the Broadcasting Act 1990 takes effect, thus beginning the deregulation of British television and radio.
New Year's Day highlights on BBC1 include the network television premieres of the science fiction drama SpaceCamp and the 1987 cult vampire film The Lost Boys.
3 January 
The sitcom The Brittas Empire makes its debut on BBC1, starring Chris Barrie and Pippa Haywood. The first episode is called Laying the Foundations. 
The puppet Gordon the Gopher returns to television with a 13-episode series on BBC1. 
7 January – BBC1 launches the local news programme, East Midlands Today for the East Midlands region. News coverage for the area had previously been provided by a seven-minute opt out from the Birmingham-based Midlands Today.
8 January 
The opening episode of the second season of Twin Peaks makes its UK debut on BBC2.
The children's arts and crafts series Bitsa makes its debut on BBC1. 
14 January – The US sitcom The Fresh Prince of Bel-Air, starring Will Smith, makes its debut on BBC2 as part of the DEF II programming strand.
17 January–2 March – Regular programming is suspended to bring live coverage of the Gulf War after Allied Forces launch Operation Desert Storm against Iraq. Over the coming weeks, there is extended coverage of events in the Persian Gulf. On BBC1, in addition to extended and additional news bulletins, a special daytime news analysis programme War in the Gulf, presented by David Dimbleby, is broadcast, although as the war progresses the length of each programme and frequency of broadcast is scaled back. ITV also broadcasts additional news and discussion programmes about the war, including all-night coverage during the early stages of the conflict and Channel 4 broadcasts a two-hour special programme at midnight as well as Saturday editions of The Channel 4 Daily. Some coverage, particularly in the earlier part of the war, comes from CNN. 
18 January – BBC2 airs a special edition of Arena in which playwright Arthur Miller meets ANC leader Nelson Mandela. In the show, Mandela talks for the first time about his life and experiences from a personal standpoint.
19 January 
The 17 January edition of Top of the Pops is broadcast, having been postponed from that date due to extended news coverage of the Gulf War.
Debut of the comedy talk show The Full Wax on BBC1, starring Ruby Wax. 
28 January – Oliver Reed appears on an edition of the late-night Channel 4 discussion programme After Dark discussing militarism, masculine stereotypes and violence to women. Reed drinks alcohol during the broadcast, leading him to become drunk, aggressive and incoherent. He refers to another member of the panel who has a moustache as a 'tache' and uses offensive language. After one hour, Reed returns from the toilet and getting more to drink, rolls on top of the noted feminist author Kate Millett. The show is briefly taken off the air following a hoax call to the station claiming that Channel 4 boss Michael Grade is furious.

February
12 February – A year after the release of Nelson Mandela from prison, BBC2 airs an edition of its Assignment documentary strand in which journalist Donald Woods returns to South Africa to give his personal assessment of that country's future.
15 February – At the close of this day's programmes, the COW ident is seen for the final time on BBC1 after six years and the BBC2 'TWO' ident is also seen for the final time after five years. 
16 February 
Both BBC1 and BBC2 receive new idents, both generated from laserdisc and featuring the BBC corporate logo introduced in 1986. BBC1 features a numeral '1' encased in a globe and BBC2 features eleven idents based around a numeral '2'. Also on this day, new idents for Open University programmes come into use. 
Matthew Kelly succeeds Bruce Forsyth as presenter of ITV's You Bet!.
25 February – Debut of the children's series Radio Roo on BBC1, starring Wayne Jackman.
26 February – Iraqi leader Saddam Hussein announces the withdrawal of Iraqi troops from Kuwait. As the war comes to its conclusion, television programming begins to return to normal.

March
March – Following the conclusion of the Gulf War, the ITN Early Morning News is halved in length and now goes on the air at 5:30pm. From this point, the ITN World News is no longer broadcast as part of the bulletin.
1 March – The monopoly on listings magazines ends with the deregulation of TV listings. Before that day, the Radio Times only published BBC listings and TVTimes only published ITV and from 1982, Channel 4, including S4C in a pull-out supplement Sbec listings. However, from that day, they can carry listings for all channels. Newspapers are also allowed to publish 7-day listings for the first time, having previously only been able to publish the present day's and two days on Saturdays. A raft of listings magazines start up in the wake of the changes.
9 March – While appearing as a guest on the ITV chat show Aspel & Company, singer Rod Stewart takes off his shoes and tosses them into the audience.
15 March – BBC1 airs Comic Relief 1991.
18 March – ITV broadcasts World in Action Special: The Birmingham Six – Their Own Story, a documentary that aired four days after the release of the Birmingham Six.<ref>"Public Issue Television: World in Action 1963–98"  p. 106</ref> It is later nominated for a BAFTA award.<ref>[http://awards.bafta.org/award/1992/television/flaherty-documentary-award bafta.org'' 1992 awards]</ref>
30 March – Frederick Wiseman's six and a half-hour documentary Near Death, on life in a Boston intensive care unit is broadcast in full by Channel 4.

April
1 April – Sue Lawley interviews Prime Minister John Major for ITV.
7 April 
ITV airs the first Prime Suspect series, starring Helen Mirren as DCI Jane Tennison. The Darling Buds of May makes its debut on ITV, starring David Jason, Pam Ferris and Catherine Zeta Jones.
The final episode of the sitcom Brush Strokes is broadcast on BBC1. 
8 April 
The Power Station, one of the channels to have survived the BSB merger with Sky, closes down at 4am after it was decided that the American MTV would be used as the music channel on BSkyB's Astra satellite service.
Channel 4's three-week Banned season features a series of films and programmes which had previously been banned from British television or cinema. The season includes the network television premieres of Scum, Monty Python's Life of Brian and Sebastiane. There is also a second broadcast of the controversial 1988 Thames documentary Death on the Rock which investigated the shooting of three members of the IRA by the SAS in Gibraltar. The season proves to be controversial and Channel 4 is investigated by the Obscene Publications Squad and referred to the Director of Public Prosecutions.
9 April – Derek Nimmo makes a cameo appearance in Australian soap Neighbours as an eccentric English aristocrat, the episode having debuted in Australia on 26 February 1990.
12 April – Debut of the children's game show Finders Keepers on Children's ITV, presented by Neil Buchanan. 
15 April — BSB's films channel The Movie Channel launches on the Astra 1B satellite. 
16 April – The network television premiere of Monty Python's Life of Brian as part of Channel 4's Banned season.
20 April – The Sports Channel on BSB is rebranded as Sky Sports.
29 April – On an edition of Terry Wogan's evening chat show Wogan and amid howls of laughter from the studio audience, public speaker David Icke claims that he is "the son of God" and that Britain will be devastated by tidal waves and earthquakes. He later said that he had been misinterpreted and that he had used the term "the son of God" to mean an "aspect" of the Infinite consciousness. The interview proved devastating for him. The BBC was later criticised for allowing the interview to go ahead with Des Christy in The Guardian calling it a "media crucifixion."
30 April – Debut of the long-running snooker-based game show Big Break on BBC1, presented by Jim Davidson.

May
3 May – The Girl from Tomorrow, a 12-part Australian children's series about a girl from the future who finds herself trapped in 1990 makes its UK debut on BBC1.
4 May – Sweden's Carola wins the 1991 Eurovision Song Contest with "Captured by a Storm Wind".
5 May – BBC1 airs the final season of the US drama series Dallas, this time being shown on Sunday afternoons just two days after the final episode had been aired in the US.
6 May 
Eurosport briefly closes after the competing Screensport channel had filed a complaint to the European Commission over its corporate structure.
 The Movie Channel begins broadcasting 24 hours a day. Previously the channel had been on air from early afternoon until the early hours of the next morning.
The network television premiere of the 1987 gangster thriller The Untouchables on BBC1, starring Kevin Costner, Sean Connery and Robert De Niro.
8 May – The first terrestrial television showing of Matthew Robbins' 1981 dark fantasy adventure Dragonslayer on ITV, starring Peter MacNichol, Caitlin Clarke, Ralph Richardson and John Hallam.
13 May – ITV airs an edition of World in Action making allegations of malpractice in the Irish beef processing industry. The programme leads to the establishment of the Beef Tribunal which at the time was to become Ireland's longest public inquiry.
20 May – The final episode of ThunderCats is broadcast on BBC1. 
22 May – Eurosport resumes broadcasting after TF1 Group steps in to replace BSkyB as their joint owners.
27 May – The network television premiere of the 1987 parody film Dragnet on BBC1, starring Dan Aykroyd and Tom Hanks.
 May – Midweek Sports Special ends after 13 years when all the English regions opt out for their own midweek sports shows. The programme continues in London as Thames Sports Special.

June
10 June  Postman Pat begins airing on ABC in Australia along with Thomas the Tank Engine & Friendss sister show Tugs.
The popular drama series Soldier Soldier makes its debut on ITV, starring Robson Green and Jerome Flynn. 
16 June – BBC1 airs Cry Freedom, Richard Attenborough's acclaimed film about South African journalist Donald Woods. It is shown in two parts with the second aired on 23 June.
18 June – BBC2 airs the concluding episode of David Lynch's drama Twin Peaks.
20 June 
The murder of Harry Collinson, the planning officer for Derwentside District Council, takes place at Butsfield, County Durham while television news crews are filming for a news item about a planning dispute. At the time of the murder, the Derwentside District Council is involved in the dispute with Albert Dryden over the erection of a building by Dryden on green belt land without planning permission and as television crews are filming, Dryden aims a handgun, a.455 Webley Mk VI revolver at Collinson and shoots him dead. As the journalists and council staff flee, Dryden opens fire again, wounding television reporter Tony Belmont and Police Constable Stephen Campbell. Dryden is convicted of Collinson's murder following a trial in April the following year. Additionally, he is also convicted of the attempted murder of council solicitor Michael Dunstan and the wounding of Campbell and Belmont. He is sentenced to life imprisonment.
An edition of BBC2's The Late Show is the final programme to be broadcast from the BBC's Lime Grove Studios. 
30 June – Channel 4 airs the first episode of Family Pride, the first British soap to feature a predominantly Asian cast. The series is produced by Central and is also shown on ITV in the Midlands region.

July
1 July – The long-lived "Wings" set makes its debut on the Channel 4 game show Countdown, alongside the use of tie-break conundrums. 
13 July – Bernard Wenton, performing as Nat King Cole, wins the second series of Stars in Their Eyes on ITV. 
14 July – Sue Lawrence wins the 1991 series of MasterChef on BBC1. 
14–25 July – Sky Sports broadcasts full live coverage of the 1991 World Student Games which are held in the UK. This is the only time that Sky has broadcast a multi-sport event and it is the only time the event has been broadcast live.
22 July – BBC1 airs an extended edition of Wogan in which Terry Wogan meets and talks to the pop star Madonna.
24 July – The final programme to be recorded at the BBC Television Theatre in Shepherd's Bush is broadcast, an edition of Wogan recorded on 18 July. 
29 July–2 August – Tim Brooke-Taylor and Lisa Aziz present QD – The Master Game, a game that aired over five nights on Channel 4 and comprised mental and physical challenges.
30 July – The Australian children's series Johnson and Friends makes its UK debut on BBC2.
31 July 
Pavarotti in the Park, a concert celebrating thirty years of Luciano Pavarotti's operatic career, is held in London's Hyde Park. The concert is attended by an audience of 125,000 who gather despite the wet weather and is broadcast to thirty countries. In the UK, the concert is aired by Sky.
The BBC's Lime Grove Studios close.

August
3 August – The network television premiere of the comedy thriller Spies, Lies & Naked Thighs on BBC1, starring Ed Begley Jr.
14 August – BBC1 airs Mozart in London, the first of a three-part series marking the bicentenary of his death and in which his earliest pieces are performed by children of about the same age as he was when he wrote them. It is the first time this has been done on British television.
23 August–1 September – Eurosport airs the World Athletics Championships for the first time. The event is also shown on the BBC.
26 August 
BBC2 airs a day of programmes paying tribute to the Lime Grove Studios which closed the previous month and includes a remake of the 1950s soap opera The Grove Family featuring stars from the present day.
A repeat is shown of An Unearthly Child, the first-ever episode of Doctor Who from 1963.
29 August – Top of the Pops is simulcast on BBC Radio 1 for the last time, the episode presented by Jakki Brambles.
31 August – NICAM stereo sound is introduced on BBC Television.

September
3 September – The sitcom 2point4 Children  makes its debut on BBC1, starring Belinda Lang and Gary Olsen.
5 September – The actor Arthur Pentelow who died on 6 August, makes his final on-screen appearance as Henry Wilks in Emmerdale. The character dies off-screen on 3 October.
9 September – New idents launch on Children's BBC, featuring the BBC corporate logo. 
11 September – ITV airs Thatcher: The Final Days, a dramatisation of the final days of Margaret Thatcher's premiership. The film stars Sylvia Syms as the former Prime Minister. 
13 September – The documentary The Leader, His Driver and the Driver's Wife airs on Channel 4. It is set during the final days of the apartheid regime in South Africa, particularly centering on Eugène Terre'Blanche, founder and leader of the far-right, white supremacist political organisation AWB. A year later, Channel 4 faces its first libel case by Jani Allan, a South African journalist who objected to her representation in the documentary.
14 September – Channel 4 airs "A Night in Japan", a night of programmes dedicated to all things Japanese, from 8pm to 6am.
17 September – The sitcom Bottom makes its debut on BBC2, starring Rik Mayall and Adrian Edmondson.
20 September – BBC2 begins a rerun of Gerry Anderson's classic 1960s series Thunderbirds. The series proves to be popular, leading to a shortage of Tracy Island toys in stores during the run up to Christmas, something that prompts Blue Peter to show viewers and their parents how to make their own Tracy Island model. An instruction sheet produced by the programme receives more than 100,000 requests.
21 September – More than eight years after launching a weekday breakfast television service, the BBC launches a five-minute long weekend breakfast news bulletin.
22 September 
Sponsorship of ITV programmes are first allowed.
The network television premiere of Adrian Lyne's 1987 thriller Fatal Attraction on ITV, starring Michael Douglas, Glenn Close and Anne Archer.
26 September 
The children's series Brum makes its debut on BBC1.
The children's game show Get Your Own Back makes its debut on BBC1, presented by Dave Benson Phillips. 
28 September – The network television premiere of the 1988 film Buster on ITV, starring Phil Collins as Great Train robber Buster Edwards.

October
1 October – The Comedy Channel launches.
2 October – The 1000th episode of the soap Brookside is broadcast on Channel 4.
3 October–2 November – ITV airs coverage of the 1991 Rugby World Cup. The competition is hosted by England, Scotland, Wales, Ireland and France.
4 October – The US animated series The Legend of Prince Valiant makes its UK debut on BBC1.
6 October – BBC1 airs Conundrum, the final episode of the original run of Dallas. The feature-length episode imagines a world in which the soap's central character, J. R. Ewing had not existed.
14 October 
BBC World Service TV launches its Asian service.
After a five year absence, Pebble Mill returns to BBC1. 
16 October – The ITV franchise auction results are announced and take effect starting midnight on 1 January 1993. It will see many notable names going off air after losing their franchises, including Thames, TVS]], TSW, TV-am and ORACLE Teletext.
19 October – The final edition of Channel Television's TV listings magazine, CTV Times is published. It had remained on sale long after the other ITV regions had replaced their listings magazine with the TVTimes in the South of England edition along with TVS as it was feared that Channel Television might cease trading without the revenue from its own magazine.
31 October – Channel 4 shows a number of Halloween themed programmes starting with the documentary Fear in the Dark narrated by Christopher Lee as well as the UK terrestrial premiere of the 1983 Tony Scott film The Hunger, starring David Bowie, Susan Sarandon and Catherine Deneuve.
October 
Scottish Television rebrands its overnight service as Scottish Night Time and removes its overnight in-vision continuity.
Cigar and pipe tobacco adverts are banned from British television.

November
14 November 
Debut of Dark Season, a six-part BBC1 science fiction series for children which sees actress Kate Winslet make her first on-screen appearance.
 Debut of the dark comedy series Murder Most Horrid on BBC2, starring Dawn French. 
15 November – BBC World Service Television begins broadcasting via satellite to Pearl River Delta, a subsidiary of STAR TV and owner of News Corporation, a conglomerate of Rupert Murdoch, a member of Hutchison Whampoa.
16 November – The network television premiere of Christopher Cain's 1988 Brat Pack western film Young Guns on ITV, starring Emilio Estevez, Kiefer Sutherland, Lou Diamond Phillips, Charlie Sheen and Terence Stamp.
17 November – Debut of Biteback on BBC1, a monthly programme that gives viewers a right-to-reply on issues raised by BBC content, presented by Julian Pettifer.
23 November – Debut of the Saturday night series Noel's House Party on BBC1, presented by Noel Edmonds.

December
3 December – Channel 4 airs the controversial documentary The Holy Family Album as part of its Without Walls series.
15–16 December – ITV airs Heroes II: The Return, a British-Australian miniseries about Operation Rimau during World War II.
16 December – ITV's Central airs the final episode of Prisoner: Cell Block H, making it the first ITV region to complete the series.
21 December 
The network television premiere of the romantic thriller The House on Carroll Street on BBC1, starring Kelly McGillis, Jeff Daniels, Mandy Patinkin and Jessica Tandy.
BBC2 airs A Perfect Christmas, featuring the best of Christmas programming from the BBC archives. Shows include festive episodes of The Flower Pot Men, Dr. Finlay's Casebook and the 1986 Christmas Day episodes of EastEnders which were watched by over 30 million viewers.
Debut of the entertainment show Barrymore on ITV, presented by Michael Barrymore. 
23 December – The network television premiere of the 1988 Oscar winning film Rain Man on BBC1, starring Dustin Hoffman and Tom Cruise.
24 December 
Christmas Eve highlights on BBC1 include the first part of the Only Fools and Horses episode Miami Twice.
The network television premiere of the 1987 thriller No Way Out on BBC1, starring Kevin Costner, Gene Hackman and Sean Young.
Debut of the animated film Father Christmas on Channel 4, featuring the voice of Mel Smith. 
25 December 
Christmas Day highlights on BBC1 includes the second edition of the Only Fools and Horses episode Miami Twice. 
The network television premiere of Tim Burton's blockbuster 1989 Batman, starring Michael Keaton and Jack Nicholson, as well as John Landis' 1988 comedy film Coming to America, starring Eddie Murphy, both on BBC1.
In an unusual move for a pre-recorded series, the Royal Christmas Message is integrated into the first of the day's episodes of Coronation Street on ITV. Character Alf Roberts sat down in front of his television, 'watched' the speech in its entirety and the episode resumed. Details of plans to include the Queen's Speech in the episode were leaked a few weeks prior to Christmas, raising concerns that the BBC may attempt to outdo their ITV rivals with their own Christmas Day surprise, but Granada Television decided to go ahead with the idea anyway.
Postman Pat returns to BBC1 with two 10th anniversary special episodes, one on Christmas morning and the other in the New Year. 
26 December – Boxing Day highlights on BBC1 include All for Love, a feature-length episode of Bergerac which serves as the series finale and the network television premiere of the 1988 hit comedy film A Fish Called Wanda, starring John Cleese and Jamie Lee Curtis.
28 December – BBC2 shows Hail! Hail! Rock 'n' Roll, Taylor Hackford's acclaimed documentary celebrating Chuck Berry's 60th birthday with footage of two concerts from 1986.
29 December 
The network television premiere of White Mischief on BBC2, starring Greta Scacchi and Charles Dance.
Debut of the bloopers series Auntie's Bloomers on BBC1, presented by Terry Wogan. 
31 December 
New Year's Eve highlights on BBC1 include the network television premiere of Back to School, starring Rodney Dangerfield and the year's end review programme Clive James on 1991.
The network television premiere of the cult 1979 Australian thriller Mad Max on BBC2, starring Mel Gibson.

Debuts

BBC1
2 January – Potsworth & Co. (1990)
3 January 
The Brittas Empire (1991–1994, 1996–1997)
Dooby's Duck Truck (1991)
Gordon the Gopher (1991)
7 January – East Midlands Today (1991–present)
8 January 
Spender (1991–1993)
Bitsa (1991–1996)
9 January – Five Children and It (1991)
10 January – Billy Webb's Amazing Stories (1991)
19 January – The Full Wax (1991–1993) 
25 January – Boys from the Bush (1991–1992)
20 February – Dodgem (1991)
21 February – Doctor at the Top (1991)
25 February – Radio Roo (1991–1993)
30 March – Fast Friends (1991)
2 April – Kinsey (1991–1992)
12 April – The Sharp End (1991)
14 April – Tonight at 8.30 (1991) (Anthology)
30 April – Big Break (1991–2002)
3 May – The Girl from Tomorrow (1990)
14 May – All Good Things (1991)
27 May – Timeless Tales from Hallmark (1990–1991)
13 July – Gravedale High (1990)
19 July – Murder in Eden (1991)
20 July – Roy's Raiders (1991)
31 August – The House of Eliott (1991–1994)
1 September – Trainer (1991–1992)
3 September – 2point4 Children (1991–1999)
25 September – Specials (1991)
26 September 
Get Your Own Back (1991–2003)
Spider! (1991)
Brum (1991–1994, 2001–2002)
4 October – The Legend of Prince Valiant (1991–1993)
14 October – Sea Trek (1991)
17 October – So You Think You've Got Troubles (1991)
25 October 
Superbods (1991–1993)
Take Two (1991–1996)
27 October – Jute City (1991)
11 November 
Watt on Earth (1991–1992)
Lifesense (1991)
14 November 
Dark Season (1991)
An Actor's Life For Me (1991)
17 November 
 Ashenden (1991)
 Merlin of the Crystal Cave (1991)
23 November – Noel's House Party (1991–1999)
29 December – Auntie's Bloomers (1991–2001)
31 December – Hogmanay Live (1991–present)
Unknown – Clarissa Explains It All (1991–1994)

BBC2
9 January – Parnell and the Englishwoman (1991)
1 February – Lazarus and Dingwall (1991)
14 February – The Fresh Prince of Bel-Air (1990–1996)
3 April – For the Greater Good (1991)
10 April – Sleepers (1991)
4 May – The Wolvis Family (1991)
8 May – Birthrights (1991–1993)
10 May – The Real McCoy (1991–1996)
30 July – Johnson and Friends (1990–1997)
16 September – Standing Room Only (1991–1994)
17 September – Bottom (1991–1995)
25 September – The Men's Room (1991)
4 October – The Power and the Glory (1991)
5 October – Performance (1991–1998)
6 October – The Boy from Andromeda (1991)
13 October – Blood and Honey (1991)
30 October – Children of the North (1991)
14 November – Murder Most Horrid (1991–1999)
23 November – Moving Pictures (1991–1996)
27 November – Clarissa (1991)

ITV
3 January – Gawain and the Green Knight (1991)
4 January – Devices and Desires (1991)
5 January – Palmer (1991)
7 January – Toucan Tecs (1991–1992)
8 January – Rod 'n' Emu (1991)
13 February – Shrinks (1991)
19 February – Fiddlers Three (1991)
24 February – Trouble in Mind (1991)
12 March – Jumble (1991–1992)
16 March – The Winjin Pom (1991)
22 March – Movies, Games and Videos (1991–2001)
26 March – The Diamond Brothers (1991)
2 April – The Advocates (1991–1992)
7 April 
The Darling Buds of May (1991–1993)
Prime Suspect (1991–2006)
10 April – A Murder of Quality (1991)
12 April – Finders Keepers (1991–1996, 2006)
3 May – Second Thoughts (1991–1994)
17 May – A Perfect Hero (1991)
26 May – The Black Candle (1991)
28 May – The Tuesday Special (1991–1997)
2 June – The Black Velvet Gown (1991)
3 June 
 Hope It Rains (1991–1992)
 In Suspicious Circumstances (1991–1996)
10 June – Soldier Soldier (1991–1997)
11 June – Selling Hitler (1991)
5 July – Rich Tea and Sympathy (1991)
7 July – Chimera (1991)
15 July – Plaza Patrol (1991)
19 July – Very Big Very Soon (1991)
21 July – Great Expectations (1991)
1 August – Adventures on Kythera (1991–1992)
4 September – Grotbags (1991–1993)
TV Mayhem (1991)
Fender Bender 500 (1990)
Monster Tails (1990)
Bill & Ted's Excellent Adventures (1990–1991)
2 September – Tiny Toon Adventures (1990–1992)
6 September 
Victor and Hugo (1991–1992)
Get Stuffed (1991–1994)
11 September – Thatcher: The Final Days (1991)
16 October – Time Riders (1991)
17 October – Captain Zed and the Zee Zone (1991–1992)
20 November – The Chestnut Soldier (1991)
November – Cartoon World (1991–1992)
28 November – Stanley and the Women (1991)
29 November – Gone to the Dogs (1991)
30 November – Beetlejuice (1989–1991)
1 December – TaleSpin (1990–1991)
8 December – Red Fox (1991)
15 December – Heroes II: The Return (1991)
20 December – To Be the Best (1991)
21 December – Barrymore (1991–2000)
25 December – Brown Bear's Wedding (1991)
Unknown 
Beverly Hills, 90210 (1990–2000)
Captain Planet and the Planeteers (1990–1996)
Samurai Pizza Cats (1991) 
Widget (1990–1992)

BBC Scotland
7 October – Restless Nation (1991–1996)

Channel 4
21 February – The Orchid House (1991)
1 May – Josie (1991)
4 May – Sharky & George (1990–1991)
21 May – Teenage Health Freak (1991–1993)
6 June – G.B.H. (1991)
30 June – Family Pride (1991–1992)
6 July – Alfred J. Kwak (1989–1990)
2 August – Packet of Three (1991–1992)
25 September – Paul Merton: The Series (1991–1993)
28 October – The Gravy Train Goes East (1991)
14 November – Secret History (1991–2004, 2013–present)
1 December – The StoryTeller: Greek Myths (1990)
3 December – The Holy Family Album (1991)
24 December – Father Christmas (1991)
28 December – The Best of Friends (1991)
 Unknown – Kid 'n Play (1990)

Sky One
12 January – Parker Lewis Can't Lose (1990–1993)
6 February – Anything for Money (1991–1992)
2 October – Something Is Out There (1988)

Channels
New channels

Defunct channels

Rebranded channels

Television shows
Changes of network affiliation

Returning this year after a break of one year or longer
 6 January – Lovejoy (1986, 1991–1994)
 16 January – Van der Valk (1972–1973, 1977, 1991–1992, 2020)
 10 April – The Two Ronnies for a 20th Anniversary special (1971–1987, 1991, 1996, 2005)
 16 September – Postman Pat (1981, 1991–1992, 1994, 1996, 2003–2008)
 14 October – Pebble Mill (1971–1986, 1991–1996)
 14 December – Up Pompeii! (1969–1975, 1991–1992)

Continuing television shows
1920s
BBC Wimbledon (1927–1939, 1946–2019, 2021–present)

1930s
The Boat Race (1938–1939, 1946–2019)
BBC Cricket (1939, 1946–1999, 2020–2024)

1940s
Come Dancing (1949–1998)

1950s
Panorama (1953–present)
This Week (1956–1978, 1986–1992)
What the Papers Say (1956–2008)
The Sky at Night (1957–present)
Blue Peter (1958–present)
Grandstand (1958–2007)

1960s
Coronation Street (1960–present)
Songs of Praise (1961–present)
World in Action (1963–1998)
Top of the Pops (1964–2006)
Match of the Day (1964–present)
Mr. and Mrs. (1965–1999)
Jackanory (1965–1996, 2006)
Sportsnight (1965–1997)
Call My Bluff (1965–2005)
The Money Programme (1966–2010)
The Big Match (1968–2002)

1970s
Rainbow (1972–1992, 1994–1997)
Emmerdale (1972–present)
Newsround (1972–present)
Last of the Summer Wine (1973–2010)
That's Life! (1973–1994)
Wish You Were Here...? (1974–2003)
Arena (1975–present)
Jim'll Fix It (1975–1994)
One Man and His Dog (1976–present)
Grange Hill (1978–2008)
The Paul Daniels Magic Show (1979–1994)
Antiques Roadshow (1979–present)
Question Time (1979–present)

1980s
Family Fortunes (1980–2002, 2006–2015, 2020–present) 
Children in Need (1980–present)
'Allo 'Allo! (1982–1992)
Wogan (1982–1992)
Brookside (1982–2003)
Countdown (1982–present)
Timewatch (1982–present)
Right to Reply (1982–2001)
Good Morning Britain (1983–1992, 2014–present)
First Tuesday (1983–1993)
Highway (1983–1993)
Blockbusters (1983–93, 1994–95, 1997, 2000–01, 2012, 2019)
Thomas the Tank Engine & Friends (1984–present)
Wide Awake Club (1984–1992)
Spitting Image (1984–1996)
Surprise Surprise (1984–2001, 2012–2015) 
The Bill (1984–2010)
Channel 4 Racing (1984–2016)
Busman's Holiday (1985–1993)
EastEnders (1985–present)
The Cook Report (1985–1998)
Crosswits (1985–1998)
Screen Two (1985–1998)
Telly Addicts (1985–1998)
Blind Date (1985–2003, 2017–2019) 
Comic Relief (1985–present)
Boon (1986–1992, 1995)
ScreenPlay (1986–1993)
Every Second Counts (1986–1993)
Lovejoy (1986–1994)
Beadle's About (1986–1996)
The Chart Show (1986–1998, 2008–2009)
Equinox (1986–2006) 
The Really Wild Show (1986–2006) 
Casualty (1986–present)
All Clued Up (1987–1992)
Going Live! (1987–1993)
Watching (1987–1993)
The Time, The Place (1987–1998)
Allsorts (1987–1995)
Going for Gold (1987–1996, 2008–2009)
Chain Letters (1987–1997)
ChuckleVision (1987–2009)
Playbox (1987–1992)
After Henry (1988–1992)
Park Avenue (1988–1992)
Count Duckula (1988–1993)
You Rang, M'Lord? (1988–1993)
You Bet! (1988–1997)
Playdays (1988–1997)
Wheel of Fortune (1988–2001) 
London's Burning (1988–2002)
On the Record (1988–2002)
Fifteen to One (1988–2003, 2013–2019) 
This Morning (1988–present)
Fun House (1989–1999)
The Channel 4 Daily (1989–1992)
Absolutely (1989–1993)
KYTV (1989–1993)
Press Gang (1989–1993)
Birds of a Feather (1989–1998, 2014–2020) 
A Bit of Fry & Laurie (1989–1995)
Desmond's (1989–1994)
Children's Ward (1989–2000) 
Mike and Angelo (1989–2000)
Bodger & Badger (1989–1999)

1990s
The 8:15 from Manchester (1990–1991)
The Mary Whitehouse Experience (1990–1992)
No Job for a Lady (1990–1992)
The Piglet Files (1990–1992)
Families (1990–1993)
Spatz (1990–1992)
The $64,000 Question (1990–1993)
Jeeves and Wooster (1990–1993)
Waiting for God (1990–1994)
Mr. Bean (1990–1995)
The Crystal Maze (1990–1995, 2016–2020) 
The Dreamstone (1990–1995)
Keeping Up Appearances (1990–1995)
Turnabout (1990–1996)
The Upper Hand (1990–1996)
Drop the Dead Donkey (1990–1998)
One Foot in the Grave (1990–2000)
The Generation Game (1971–1982, 1990–2002') How 2 (1990–2006) Stars in Their Eyes (1990–2006, 2015)Rosie and Jim (1990–2000)MasterChef (1990–2001, 2005–present)

Ending this year
 11 February – About Face (1989–1991)
 5 March – Rod, Jane and Freddy (1981–1991)
 17 March – Grim Tales (1989–1991)
 28 March – Gordon the Gopher (1991)
 7 April – Brush Strokes (1986–1991)
 20 April – The Winjin Pom (1991)
 20 May – ThunderCats (1987–1991)
 31 May Tricky Business (1989–1991)Alfonso Bonzo (1990–1991)
 4 June – Chancer (1990–1991)
 21 June – A Perfect Hero (1991)
 15 July – Takeover Bid (1990–1991)
 22 July – Everybody's Equal (1989–1991)
 28 July – Chimera (1991)
 28 August – I Can Do That (1988–1991)
 29 August – The Play on One (1988–1991)
 30 August – All Clued Up (1988–1991) 
 3 September – Clockwise (1989–1991)
 14 September – The 8:15 from Manchester (1990–1991)
 8 October – French Fields (1989–1991)
 9 October – Never the Twain (1981–1991)
 23 October – The Men's Room (1991)
 31 October – 4 Square (1988–1991)
 3 November – Bread (1986–1991)
 12 November – Making Out (1989–1991)
 18 November – Naked Video (1986–1991)
 20 November – Children of the North (1991)
 11 December – Clarissa (1991)
 19 December – Stanley and the Women (1991)
 26 December – Bergerac (1981–1991)
 27 December – To Be the Best (1991)

Births
 2 January – Danny Miller, actor (Emmerdale)
 21 January – Craig Roberts, Welsh actor (The Story of Tracy Beaker'')
 14 February – Charlie G. Hawkins, actor
 17 February – Bonnie Wright, actress
 28 February – Sarah Bolger, actress
 27 April – Rebecca Ryan, actress
 5 September – Skandar Keynes, actor
 26 September – Charlotte Spencer, actress
 14 October – Shona McGarty, actress
 29 October – Toby Tarrant

Deaths

See also
 1991 in British music
 1991 in British radio
 1991 in Scottish television
 1991 in the United Kingdom
 List of British films of 1991

References